Ibituruna is a municipality in the state of Minas Gerais in the Southeast region of Brazil.

Geography 
According to IBGE (2017), the municipality is in the Immediate Geographic Region of Lavras, in the Intermediate Geographic Region of Varginha.

Ecclesiastical circumscription 
The municipality is part of the Roman Catholic Diocese of São João del-Rei.

See also
List of municipalities in Minas Gerais

References

Municipalities in Minas Gerais